Panthasaurus is an extinct genus of large temnospondyl amphibian belonging to the family Metoposauridae that lived in India during the Late Triassic (Norian) of central India. It contains one species, Panthasaurus maleriensis from the Lower Maleri Formation of India.

Taxonomy
Metoposaurus maleriensis was coined by Chowdbury (1965) for metoposaurid remains from the Maleri Formation in the Pranhita–Godavari Basin of eastern India. Later, Hunt (1993) transferred the species to the genus Buettneria, which was followed by Sulej (2002).

In a paper published in 2018, Chakravorti and Sengupta concluded that specimens of Metoposaurus maleriensis formed a morphospace and morphotype distinct from metoposaurids found in Laurasia. They erected a new genus, Panthasaurus, for M. maleriensis.

See also

 Triassic–Jurassic extinction event
 Timeline of paleontology

References

Triassic temnospondyls of Asia
Late Triassic amphibians of Asia
Norian genera
Trematosaurs
Fossil taxa described in 2018
Triassic India